The 1921 Chico State Wildcats football team represented Chico State Teachers College—now known as California State University, Chico—as an independent during the 1921 college football season. They became a charter member of the California Coast Conference (CCC) in 1922. Led by first-year head coach George Sperry, Chico State compiled a record of 4–2–1. The Wildcats outscored their opponents 84–63 for the season. They played home games at College Field in Chico, California.

Schedule

References

Chico State
Chico State Wildcats football seasons
Chico State Wildcats football